InCulto was a Lithuanian music group. It has the following members: Colombian-born Lithuanian Jurgis Didžiulis (lead vocal), Aurelijus Morlencas, Sergej Makidon, Jievaras Jasinskis and Laurynas Lapė.

Eurovision 2010

In their first Eurovision attempt, the band came second after LT United in the Lithuanian national final of 2006 with their song Welcome To Lithuania. On 4 March 2010, Inculto won the Lithuanian national final to represent Lithuania in the Eurovision Song Contest 2010. They performed Eastern European Funk in the second semi-final held on 27 May 2010 in Oslo, Norway. The band did not receive enough points to get into the final. However they did receive top points (12) from one country, Ireland.

Splitting up
The band announced, in a Facebook article, that they would split up by the end of January 2011. They also decided to finish up by releasing their last album for free. In the article they say that they are very happy with 2010 and would like to stop at a high point for the band.

Discography

Albums 
 PostSovPop (2004)
 Marijos Žemės Superhitai (2007)
 Closer Than You Think (2010)

Singles 
 "Jei labai nori" (with Linas Karalius) (2004)
 "Suk, suk ratelį" (2004)
 "Boogaloo" (2005)
 "Welcome To Lithuania" (2006)
 "Reikia bandyt" (feat. Erica Jennings) (2007)
 "Pasiilgau namų" (feat. Andrius Rimiškis) (2007)
 "Eastern European Funk" (2010)

Awards and nominations

|-
|2004 ||  InCulto || Best New Act in Bravo Music Awards|| 
|-
|2005 ||  InCulto || Best Band in Bravo Music Awards || 
|-
|2005 ||  InCulto || Best Alternative Act in Radiocentras Music Awards || 
|-
|2006 ||  InCulto || MTV Europe Music Award for Best Baltic Act || 
|-

References

External links

Official website

''

Lithuania in the Eurovision Song Contest
Eurovision Song Contest entrants for Lithuania
Eurovision Song Contest entrants of 2010